Cordelia Lauren Griffith (born 19 September 1995) is an English cricketer who currently plays for Middlesex, Sunrisers and Manchester Originals. She plays as a right-handed batter. She has previously played for Essex, as well as Surrey Stars and Yorkshire Diamonds in the Women's Cricket Super League.

Early life
Griffith was born on 19 September 1995 in Islington, Greater London. Her father, Frank, played county cricket for Derbyshire.

Domestic career
Griffith made her county debut in 2010, for Essex in a match against Warwickshire. She scored 5 as her team lost by 56 runs. She played two further games that season, but after this did not become a regular in Essex's side until 2013. Her first breakthrough season came in the 2016 Women's County Championship, scoring 177 runs at 35.40, including two half-centuries. She also began captaining Essex in 2016, a post she held until the end of the 2018 season. The following season, despite only playing two Championship matches, she scored 182 runs including her maiden county century, 113* against Gloucestershire in a play-off to help secure her side's promotion to Division 2. In 2018 she scored her second List A century, with 155* against Suffolk.

Griffith was loaned to Middlesex for the 2018 Women's Twenty20 Cup, but was injured for the whole tournament and only managed to appear once for her new side, in the London Cup. She signed permanently for Middlesex ahead of the 2019 season and made an instant impression, ending the season as the side's leading run-scorer in the Twenty20 Cup and second-highest run-scorer in the County Championship, as well as hitting her third List A century. She scored 187 runs for the side in the 2021 Women's Twenty20 Cup, including her Twenty20 high score of 73, made against Hampshire. She scored 60 runs in the 2022 Women's Twenty20 Cup without being dismissed, playing two matches.

Griffith also played for Surrey Stars in the Women's Cricket Super League in 2016 and 2017, and for Yorkshire Diamonds in 2019. In 2016, she played 5 matches and scored 35 runs. She did not play for the side in 2017. In 2019, for the Diamonds, she played three matches and scored 18 runs. 

In 2020, Griffith played for Sunrisers in the Rachael Heyhoe Flint Trophy. She appeared in 4 matches, scoring 84 runs at an average of 21.00, with a best of 41 against Western Storm. In December 2020, it was announced that Griffith was one of the 41 female cricketers that had signed a full-time domestic contract. In 2021, she was Sunrisers' leading run-scorer in the Rachael Heyhoe Flint Trophy, with 273 runs at an average of 39.00. She hit two half-centuries, including 91 made against Southern Vipers. She was also her side's leading run-scorer in the Charlotte Edwards Cup, with 129 runs including one half-century. Griffith also played for Manchester Originals in The Hundred, scoring 20 runs in five innings. In 2022, she played eight matches for Sunrisers, across the Charlotte Edwards Cup and the Rachael Heyhoe Flint Trophy, and was the side's second-highest run-scorer in the Rachael Heyhoe Flint Trophy, with 178 runs including two half-centuries. She also played four matches for Manchester Originals in The Hundred.

Griffith has also played for various England age-group and academy sides, as well as appearing in the 2013 Super Fours for Sapphires.

References

External links
 
 

1995 births
Living people
People from Islington (district)
Essex women cricketers
Middlesex women cricketers
Surrey Stars cricketers
Yorkshire Diamonds cricketers
Sunrisers women's cricketers
Manchester Originals cricketers